Cyrtalastor is a monotypic Afrotropical genus of potter wasps. The sole species is Cyrtalastor moruloides.

References

Potter wasps
Monotypic Hymenoptera genera